Celso Machado (born January 27, 1953) is a Brazilian world music guitarist, percussionist and multi-instrumentalist who lives in Gibsons, British Columbia, Canada.  For over forty years he has performed on concert stages throughout Brazil, Western Europe and Canada, as well as in the United States.  He is active as a teacher, composer and recording artist.  According to his biography, he has played onstage with renowned guitarists Sergio and Odair Assad, Badi Assad, Romero Lubambo, Yamandu Costa, Cristina Azuma, Peter Finger, and Solorazaf and has been an opening act for Brazilian jazz musicians including Gilberto Gil and Bebel Gilberto.

He is known for the ability to produce birds call imitations using wind and percussion instruments.

References

External links
 Official website

1953 births
Living people
World music percussionists
Brazilian emigrants to Canada
Brazilian percussionists
Brazilian guitarists
Brazilian male guitarists
Brazilian multi-instrumentalists
Canadian world music musicians
Canadian percussionists
Musicians from Vancouver
Canadian Folk Music Award winners